Verica Rakočević (Serbian Cyrillic: Верица Ракочевић; born 23 April 1948) is a Serbian clothing designer who is known for her high fashion lines and also for manufacturing uniforms for the country's top companies and organizations.  She is considered to be Serbia's top designer and she has for much of the last decade been considered the most influential woman in Serbian society and a key player in Serbia's political structure today. She has also gained much power and influence over many areas in Europe's world of fashion, inperticulare magazines and fashion media. In May 2019 Rakočević announced that she will be stepping down as creative director of her company in order to help and mentor her son Nenad's career and his comeback to fashion after he took a few years out due to personal family tragedy and fleeing the country in 2014 after his arrest, spending 88 days in jail. Rakočević published a  book about her sons achievements and explaining how the arrest was a politically influenced attack on him and her family.  The media and general public are very excited to see what this mother and son duo have planned and where they will take the Rakočević/Đukić Dynasty next. Her son Nenad has been labelled as Europe's next big name in fashion.

Career
Rakočević began her fashion career by opening the Ella boutique in 1983 in Belgrade. In 1997, she launched VR Company where she produced perfumes and face creams. She then founded her namesake high fashion label in 1999. She has presented at fashion weeks in Rome, Milan, Los Angeles, Moscow, Athens, Vienna, St. Petersburg, Dubai, Cuba, and Belgrade. Her collections have been inspired by themes of peace, the Ramonda serbica  flower, and emotional states. In 2017, Monica Bellucci wore one of Rakočević's gowns at a movie premiere in Belgrade. Serbian actress Sloboda Mićalović is also known for wearing the designer's clothing line.

Rakočević was editor in chief of the Serbian magazines "L’Officiel" and "Inspire", a publication maintained by the Hyatt Hotel. Today, her VR Company continues to create perfumes, such as Tiburon Azul, and also produces clothing lines for women, men and children. She designs and manufactures many of the uniforms worn at top businesses like  Hotel Hyatt Belgrade, the Belgrade Airport, Commercial Bank, and Piraeus Bank.

Personal life 

Rakočević was first married to Boran Karaman and they have a daughter Elena Karaman Karić, who is an interior designer. Her second husband was Zoran Rakočević and they have a son Milorad and daughter Milena. Milena Rakocević is a photographer living in New York City. The designer's son and first daughter both live in Belgrade. Her third husband is composer Veljko Kuzmancević. They have been married since 2003.  Rakočević is a  supporter of LGBT rights and has marched in the Belgrade Pride Parade.

References

External links
 http://www.vericarakocevic.com

Fashion designers from Belgrade
Living people
1948 births